Loveleina Wong-Sang (born 14 February 2002) is a French Polynesian shot-putter and discus thrower who has represented French Polynesia at the Pacific Games and Pacific Mini Games.

She competed in the 2019 Pacific Games in Apia, coming ninth in the shot-put. In 2021 she won bronze in the shot put at the French junior championships. At the 2022 Pacific Mini Games in Saipan she won silver in the discus and bronze in the shot put.

Wong-sang is coached by Tumatai Dauphin.

References

Living people
2002 births
French Polynesian shot putters
French Polynesian discus throwers